Olivier Fabrice Ochanine (born September 7, 1979) is a French conductor and flutist; he is founding Music Director and Principal Conductor of the Sun Symphony Orchestra of Hanoi, Vietnam and the former Music Director and Chief Conductor of the Philippine Philharmonic Orchestra (PPO), the national orchestra of the Philippines.

Ochanine holds a master's degree in Conducting from the University of Southern California and pursued a Doctorate in Orchestral Conducting, at the Cincinnati College - Conservatory of Music, before taking up his post with the Philippine Philharmonic.

Professional career 

Olivier Ochanine is the 1st Prize Winner of the 2015 Antal Dorati International Conducting Competition in Budapest, Hungary, in which he surpassed nearly 120 other conductors from 23 countries; the prize leads to further performances in Europe.  In addition, he is winner of the prestigious The American Prize (2015) in the Professional Orchestra Conducting division.  Olivier is also 2nd Prize Winner in the 2015 London Classical Soloists International Conducting Competition, where he conducted the orchestra in various Beethoven symphonies.

Regularly praised for his charisma on and off podium as well as for his breadth of orchestral repertoire, Olivier was the youngest Music Director of the Philippine Philharmonic Orchestra in the orchestra's history.

A native of Paris, Olivier Ochanine began music studies in France.  He continued music studies in the United States, and expanded his focus to orchestral conducting, taking up graduate studies and attending master classes with some of the best conducting mentors, including Mark Gibson, Gustav Meier, Marin Alsop, Larry Livingston, Robert Baldwin, John Barnett, John Farrer, and Achim Holub.  He obtained his master's degree in Conducting from the University of Southern California (USC), where he was given the Conducting Department Award in 2003. In 2009, he began his Doctoral Studies in Orchestral Conducting at the Cincinnati College-Conservatory of Music under Mark Gibson.

A flutist and bassist, Olivier earned his bachelor's degree from the University of Kentucky. He has also played as bassist for the Lexington Philharmonic Orchestra.

Olivier has been invited to the California Conductors Institute several times.  In 2009, Mr. Ochanine was among a handful of conductors nationally to be invited by Baltimore Symphony Orchestra Music Director Marin Alsop to conduct in the Cabrillo Music Festival in Santa Cruz, California and to participate in a conducting workshop.  He has also been a participant in the Cincinnati College-Conservatory's conducting workshops.

Olivier's term with the Philippine Philharmonic Orchestra, the nation's leading orchestra, started with the 2010-2011 performance season.  Under his leadership, the orchestra performed numerous Philippine premieres and made its first recording in over a decade.  Ochanine has also been credited for greatly improving the level of the PPO's playing.

In the Philippines, Olivier has been an active musician, leading masterclasses of chamber music at schools; he has also led conducting masterclasses for the Cultural Center of the Philippines.  As part of his outreach mission, Olivier served for several years as head visiting conductor for the Orchestra of the Filipino Youth, a program geared toward talented youth that stem from severely unfortunate financial backgrounds.  Olivier is a strong believer in advocacy and heritage, and recently won a campaign he spearheaded to save the best performance hall in Manila - the Philam Life Theater - from demolishment by a large commercial developer.

In 2016, Olivier's project to bring the Philippine Philharmonic Orchestra to Carnegie Hall materialized after years of fundraising and planning, making this the first time a Filipino orchestra has performed in the famed venue. 

He is a regular guest conductor with the Vietnam National Symphony Orchestra and Sichuan Philharmonic Orchestra (China), and has also conducted the Cincinnati College-Conservatory Orchestras, Budapest MAV Symphony Orchestra, and George Enescu Philharmonic Orchestra, Moscow State Symphony Orchestra, and Gyor Philharmonic Orchestra, among others.

References

External links 
 Official Website
 Ochanine electrifies
 Review: Rite of Spring

Living people
French musicians
1979 births
French classical flautists